Gaoyi railway station is a station on Beijing–Guangzhou railway in Gaoyi County, Shijiazhuang, Hebei.

History 
The station was opened in 1903.

See also 

 Gaoyi West railway station

References 

Railway stations in Hebei
Stations on the Beijing–Guangzhou Railway
Railway stations in China opened in 1903